The 2020 Patriot League men's basketball tournament was the postseason tournament for the Patriot League during the 2019–20 NCAA Division I men's basketball season. It was held on March 3, 5, 8, and 11, with the higher seed in each match up hosting at their respective campus sites. No. 3 seed Boston University defeated Colgate 64–61 in the championship game to win the conference tournament championship and the conference's automatic bid to the 2020 NCAA Division I men's basketball tournament. The NCAA Tournament would be subsequently canceled in order to mitigate the spread of COVID-19. The Patriot League was the final conference to hold its championship game before all others remaining were cancelled due to the COVID-19 pandemic.

The Patriot League Tournament Championship was Boston University's first since joining the conference in 2013.

Seeds
All 10 Patriot League teams are eligible for the tournament. The top six teams receive a first round bye. Teams are seeded by record within the conference, with a tiebreaker system to seed teams with identical conference records.

Schedule

Bracket

References

Tournament
Patriot League men's basketball tournament
Patriot League men's basketball tournament